Furongbeilu Subdistrict is an urban subdistrict and the seat of Kaifu District, Changsha City, Hunan Province, China. The subdistrict is located in the west central part of the district and on the eastern bank of the Xiang River. It is bordered to the north by Laodaohe Subdistrict, to the east by Liuyanghe Subdistrict, to the south by Xinhe and Wujialing Subdistricts.

References

Subdistricts of Changsha
Kaifu District